Scott Lewis McCaughey is an American singer, guitarist and songwriter and the leader of the Seattle and Portland-based bands The Young Fresh Fellows and The Minus 5. He was also an auxiliary member of the American rock band R.E.M. from 1994 until the band's break-up in 2011, contributing to the studio albums New Adventures in Hi-Fi, Up, Reveal, Around the Sun, Accelerate and Collapse into Now.

Career

Young Fresh Fellows

McCaughey started his career with the indie rock band Young Fresh Fellows. Beginning in January, 1980, he was also a writer for the Seattle monthly The Rocket.

R.E.M.
From 1994 until 2011, McCaughey worked with R.E.M. both on stage and in the studio. “When R.E.M. came to Seattle to work on Automatic for the People, Peter [Buck] called me up. He probably didn’t know anybody else in town. We’d go out to eat or have drinks pretty regularly while he was here. And then he ended up moving out here. Once he was here, we started playing together a lot, doing all The Minus 5 stuff." It was McCaughey who introduced Buck to his future wife, Stephanie. Buck invited McCaughey to join R.E.M. on their 1995 Monster tour, initially as a second guitarist. “[Peter] said, ‘I wouldn’t ask you if the Fellows were playing a lot.' But the Fellows were not really doing anything; we’d kind of brought it down to a crawl. I told him, ‘Sure, I’d like to try.’ I had to audition because I didn't know the rest of the guys as well as Peter.”

McCaughey remained with R.E.M. in various capacities until the band's dissolution. He contributed to the studio albums New Adventures in Hi-Fi, Up, Reveal, Around the Sun, Accelerate and Collapse into Now. Additionally, he has received credits for his work on the live albums R.E.M. Live and Live at The Olympia album as well as their 2003 greatest hits collection, In Time. When working with R.E.M., McCaughey played guitar, bass guitar, keyboards, and sang backing vocals.

The Minus 5 and Tuatara
R.E.M. members and side musicians formed The Minus 5 and Tuatara in the mid-1990s.

Moween
In June 2003, McCaughey recorded a song with Moween (Peter Schoemaker/Bram van den Berg) at the IDQ studio in Utrecht, titled "."

The Baseball Project
In 2008, McCaughey formed the side band The Baseball Project with Buck, Steve Wynn and Linda Pitmon. Their first album, Volume 1: Frozen Ropes and Dying Quails, celebrates many aspects of baseball culture, and includes a song in tribute to Pittsburgh Pirates pitcher Harvey Haddix.

The Venus Three

He is also bassist for Robyn Hitchcock's touring band The Venus 3, which has included Bill Rieflin (drums) and Peter Buck (guitar).

Tuatara
McCaughey also plays in Tuatara, an instrumental group which features Peter Buck from R.E.M.

The No Ones
McCaughey is a member of The No Ones, a jangle pop supergroup. Other members include Peter Buck, Frode Strømstad, and Arne Kjelsrud Mathisen (from I Was A King). Their debut EP The Sun Station (Coastal Town Recordings) also features guest appearances by Steve Wynn and Patterson Hood.

Stroke
McCaughey suffered a stroke on November 16, 2017.  Two benefit concerts were held in January, 2018, to raise money for McCaughey's medical bills. Artists included Peter Buck, Mike Mills, Bill Berry, Alejandro Escovedo, M Ward, James Mercer, Corin Tucker, the Dharma Bums, the Decemberists, and Patterson Hood.  McCaughey recovered substantially from his stroke in 2018, and began playing a series of well received shows at venues in Portland, Oregon, where he lives.

Discography

Solo releases
 1989: My Chartreuse Opinion (PopLlama)
 2015: Spain Capers (Rock & Roll Inc. / Book) as Scott the Hoople
 2020: Sad Box and Other Hits as Scott the Hoople

References

External links
 Universal Trendsetter – A Scott McCaughey fansite
 The Minus 5 website
 
 

Living people
Year of birth missing (living people)
R.E.M. personnel
Place of birth missing (living people)
American rock guitarists
American male guitarists
American rock singers
American mandolinists
American multi-instrumentalists
American rock keyboardists
American rock bass guitarists
American male bass guitarists
The Minus 5 members
Tuatara (band) members
The Young Fresh Fellows members
Tired Pony members
Singers from Washington (state)
Musicians from Seattle
Musicians from Portland, Oregon
The Baseball Project members
American alternative rock musicians
Guitarists from Washington (state)
Guitarists from Oregon
Filthy Friends members